"Nai" (Yes) is a CD single by popular Greek artist Irini Merkouri released in December 2007 by Sony BMG Greece.

Track listing

 "Kane Ena Tsigaro"
 "Nai"

Charts

References

2007 singles
Greek-language songs
Irini Merkouri songs
2007 songs